Comedy Nights Live is an Indian Hindi-language stand-up comedy - humour television series, which premiered on 31 January 2016, and was broadcast on Colors TV. The series aired on Sunday nights. The series replaced Colors TV's  show Comedy Nights with Kapil.

Krushna Abhishek hosted this show. Siddharth Sagar, Sudesh Lehri, Bharti Singh, Rashami Desai are some of the comedians of the show. Madhuri Dixit was the first celebrity to appear on the show.

Cast

Season 1
 Krushna Abhishek as Pappu Singh/Pappi Singh/ Tulsi/various characters
 Bharti Singh as Chintu Sharma
 Sudesh Lehri as Banwari Lal (Pappu's dad)/various characters
 Siddharth Sagar as Mangala Mufatlal/various characters
  Gaurav Dubey as foreigner
 Raju Srivastav as various characters
 Shakeel Siddiqui as various characters
  Firoz Ahmed as Permanent guest
 Upasana Singh as Pinki Bua
Usha Nadkarni as Dadi
 Surbhi Jyoti as Actress
Adaa Khan as Itee
Puja Banerjee

Season 2
Krushna Abhishek as Pappu Singh
 Bharti Singh as Chintu Sharma
 Sudesh Lehri as Banwari Lal (Pappu's dad)
 Kratika Sengar as Itee
 Divyanka Tripathi as Actress

List of episodes

References

External links
Official website

Indian television sketch shows
2016 Indian television series debuts
Hindi-language television shows
Indian stand-up comedy television series
Colors TV original programming
2016 Indian television series endings
Television series by Optimystix Entertainment